This is a list of rock music genres consisting of subgenres of popular music that have roots in 1940s and 1950s rock and roll, and which developed into a distinct identity as rock music in the 1960s, particularly in the United States and United Kingdom. By the late 1960s, a number of identifiable rock music subgenres had emerged, including hybrids like blues rock, folk rock, country rock, and jazz-rock fusion, many of which contributed to the development of psychedelic rock influenced by the counter-cultural psychedelic scene. New genres that emerged from this scene included progressive rock, which extended the artistic elements; glam rock, which highlighted showmanship and visual style; and the diverse and enduring major subgenre of heavy metal, which emphasized volume, power, and speed. In the second half of the 1970s, punk rock both intensified and reacted against some of these trends to produce a raw, energetic form of music characterized by overt political and social critiques. Punk was an influence into the 1980s on the subsequent development of other subgenres, including new wave, post-punk and eventually the alternative rock movement. From the 1990s alternative rock began to dominate rock music and break through into the mainstream in the form of grunge, Britpop, and indie rock. Further fusion subgenres have since emerged as well as conscious attempts to revisit rock's history.

A
 Acid rock
 Adult contemporary music
 Adult alternative
 Afro-punk
 Afro rock
 Alternative country
 Alternative dance
 Alternative metal
 Alternative rock
 Americana music
 Anarcho-punk
 Anti folk
 Anatolian rock
 Arena rock
 Art punk
 Art rock
 Avant-garde metal

B
 Baroque pop
 Baggy
 Bandana thrash
 Bay Area thrash metal
 Beach music
 Beat music
 Bent edge
 Bigbit
 Biker metal
 BisRock
 Blackgaze
 Blackened death metal
 Blackened grindcore
 Blackened screamo
 Black metal
 Black n' roll
 Blues rock
 Boogie rock
 Brazilian thrash metal
 British folk rock
 Britpop
 Britpop Revival
 Bubblegum music

C
 Canterbury sound
 Cello rock and cello metal
 Chillwave
 Celtic punk
 Celtic metal
 Celtic rock
 Chicano rock
 Chamber pop
 Christian alternative rock
 Christian hardcore
 Christian metal
 Christian punk
 Christian rock
 Cock rock
 Coldwave
 College rock
 Comedy rock
 Country rock
 Cowpunk
 Crossover thrash
 Crunkcore
 Crust punk
 Cybergrind
 Cyberpunk

D
 Dance-punk
 Dance-rock
 Dark cabaret
 Darkwave
 D-beat
 Death 'n' roll
 Deathcore
 Death-doom
 Deathgrind
 Death metal
 Deathrock
 Desert blues
 Digital hardcore
 Djent
 Dolewave
 Doom metal
 Dream pop
 Drone metal
 Dunedin sound

E
 Electropunk
 Electronicore
 Electronic rock
 Emo
 Emo pop
 Emo revival
 Emo rap
 Ethereal wave
 Experimental rock
 Extreme metal

F
 Flamenco rock
 Florida death metal
 Folk metal
 Folk punk
 Folk rock
 Funk metal
 Funk rock

G
 Garage punk
 Garage rock
 Geek rock
 Glam metal
 Glam punk
 Glam rock
 Goregrind
 Gothabilly
 Gothic metal
 Gothic rock
 Grebo
 Grindcore
 Grindie
 Groove metal
 Group Sounds
 Grunge
 Gypsy punk

H
 Hard rock
 Hardcore punk
 Heartland rock
 Heavy hardcore
 Heavy metal
 Horror punk

I
 Indie folk
 Indie pop
 Indie rock
 Indietronica
 Indorock
 Industrial metal
 Industrial rock
 Instrumental rock
 Italian occult psychedelia

J
 Jazz rock
 Jangle pop
 Jersey Shore sound

K
 Krautrock
 Kawaii metal

L
 Latin alternative
 Latin metal
 Latin rock
 Lovers' rock

M
 Madchester
 Manila Sound
 Mathcore
 Math rock
 Medieval folk rock
 Medieval metal
 Melodic death metal
 Melodic hardcore
 Melodic metalcore
 Midwest emo
 Metalcore
 Metalstep
 Mod revival
 Modern Rock

N
 Nardcore
 National Socialist Black Metal
 Nedal
 Neue Deutsche Härte
 Neue Deutsche Todeskunst
 Neue Deutsche Welle
 Neoclassical dark wave
 Neoclassical metal
 Neon pop
 Neo-progressive rock
 Neo-psychedelia
 New rave
 New wave
 New wave of new wave
 New Weird America
 Nintendocore
 Noise pop
 Noise rock
 No wave
 Nu gaze
 Nu metal
 Nu metalcore

O
 Occult rock
 Oi!
 Ostrock
 Ostmetal
 Outlaw Country

P
 Pagan metal
 Pagan rock
 Paisley Underground
 Peace punk
 Pinoy rock
 Pirate metal
 Pop punk
 Pop rock
 Pornogrind
 Post-britpop
 Post-grunge
 Post-hardcore
 Post-metal
 Post-punk
 Post-punk revival
 Post-rock
 Power ballad
 Power pop
 Power metal
 Powerviolence
 Progressive metal
 Progressive metalcore
 Progressive pop
 Progressive rock
 Progressive soul
 Protopunk
 Psychedelic funk
 Psychedelic pop
 Psychedelic rock
 Psychedelic soul
 Psychobilly
 Pub rock (Australia)
 Pub rock (United Kingdom)
 Punk blues
 Punk jazz
 Punk rap
Punk Rock
 Punk pathetique

Q
 Queercore

R
 Raga rock
 Rapcore
 Rap metal
 Rap rock
 Reggae rock
Red dirt
 Riot grrrl
 Rock Against Communism
 Rock and roll
 Rocksteady
 Rockabilly
 Rock music
 Rock in Opposition
 Roots rock

S
 Sadcore
 Samba rock
 Screamo
 Shaman punk
 Shoegaze
 Shock rock
 Ska punk
 Skate punk
 Slacker rock
 Slowcore
 Sludge metal
 Soft rock
 Southern rock
 Space rock
 Speed metal
 Steampunk
 Straight edge
 Stoner rock
 Street punk
 Sufi rock
 Sunshine pop
 Surf music
 Swamp pop
 Swamp rock
Swedish death metal
 Symphonic black metal
 Symphonic metal
 Synth-metal
 Synth Pop
 Synth-punk

T
 Taqwacore
 Technical death metal
 Teutonic thrash metal
 Thrashcore
 Thrash metal
 Time Lord rock
Trall punk
 Trap metal
 Trønder rock
 Tropicália
 Tropical rock
 Tulsa Sound
 2 Tone

U
 UK 82
 Unblack metal

V
 VIA
 Viking metal
 Viking rock
 Visual kei

W
 Wagnerian rock
 War metal
 Wizard rock
 Wonky pop

Y
 Yacht rock
 Youth crew

Z
 Zeuhl

See also
 Electronics in rock music
 Heavy metal genres
 Rock festival
 List of popular music genres
 List of subcultures

References

 
rock music
Genres